Cassia grandis, one of several species called pink shower tree, and known as carao in Spanish, is a flowering plant in the family Fabaceae, native to the neotropics, that grows up to . The species is distributed from southern México, to Venezuela and Ecuador. It grows in forests and open fields at lower elevations, and is known to be planted as an ornamental.  In at least Costa Rica, its pods are stewed into a molasses-like syrup, taken as a sweetener and for its nutritional and medicinal effects, called Jarabe (or Miel) de Carao.

Growth
During the dry season, the tree sheds its old leaves, giving way to racemes of pastel pink flowers.

References

External links
 
 

grandis
Trees of Mexico
Trees of Belize
Trees of Costa Rica
Trees of El Salvador
Trees of Guatemala
Trees of Honduras
Trees of Nicaragua
Trees of Panama
Trees of Venezuela
Trees of Colombia
Trees of Ecuador
Trees of Brazil